Quezon–Villa Anita was a Philippines basketball club who joined the National Basketball Conference. The team was spearheaded by ex-PBA players Bryan Gahol and Anastacio 'Robin' Mendoza.

Current roster

References

External links
Quezon-Villa Anita (Archived)

National Basketball Conference teams
Sports in Quezon